The 2016 Scottish Women's Premier League was the 15th season of the SWPL, the highest division of women's football in Scotland since 2002. For the first time, the league was split into two divisions of eight teams each, SWPL 1 and SWPL 2. 

The split into two divisions reduced the number of top-division teams from 12 to 8. The change was made to increase competitiveness in the league. SWPL 2 became the new level 2 Scottish women's league, displacing the First Division (SWFL 1) to level 3.

The restructuring had begun in 2015 by requiring four SWPL clubs to be effectively relegated. Lewis Melee quoted a manager critical of the SWF's consultation and lack of notice for the league's new clubs: "Rather than saying we need to finish 11th for our first year in the league they were having to finish 8th and they didn’t have a 6 to 12-month plan to prepare… they were probably the ones that suffered more than anyone".

At the end of the season in October 2016, Glasgow City were champions, ahead of Hibernian. City became the first senior football club to win ten Scottish league titles in succession. The champions of SWPL 2 were Hamilton Academical.

Teams

SWPL 1

SWPL 2

SWPL 1

Format
In the first season after the reduction to eight teams a new format is played. Teams will play each other three times, with the bottom placed team being relegated after the season. The split into a championship and relegation group is discontinued.

Standings
Teams will play 21 matches each.

Results

 Matches 1 to 14

 Matches 15 to 21

SWPL 2

Format
In the first season after the reduction to eight teams a new format is played. Teams will play each other three times, with the bottom placed team being relegated after the season. The split into a championship and relegation group is discontinued.

Standings
Teams will play 21 matches each.

Results

 Matches 1 to 14

 Matches 15 to 21

References

External links
Season at soccerway.com

1
Scot
Scot
Scottish Women's Premier League seasons